Projector (stylized : projector, or on the reissue p.r.o.j.e.c.t.o.r.) is the fourth studio album by Swedish melodic death metal band Dark Tranquillity.

Lineup change
In January 1999, with the album recorded months prior, and its release months ahead, Fredrik Johansson and Dark Tranquillity mutually split. It was due to Johansson wanting to focus more on being a father, meaning he couldn't tour with the band. Johansson didn’t want to leave his family anymore and he wanted to keep a day job as opposed to the difficulties of being in the music industry. There were mutually no hard feelings between both parties, but with all of Johansson's reasons, the band still saw it as a lack of commitment to Dark Tranquillity as well. The album marks the last release with Johansson.

With difficulties always finding a new guitar player, a switch then occurred in the band when Johansson's empty guitarist position was then taken the band's bassist Martin Henriksson, who was reluctant at the time to do the switch, due to his belief of being an average guitar player, but still went on to do so. To take Henriksson's bassist position, the band hired Michael Nicklasson.

Lastly, since the album included a lot of piano, keyboards and electronics and the band wanting it to become an integral part of the band's later sound, the band also hired an additional full-time member, Martin Brändström as their first keyboardist ever to complete the new lineup to tour for the album. With the lineup, they played live bonus tracks of the reissue of this album and filmed a music video for "ThereIn".

Style
Projector marked a noteworthy progression in the band's style, featuring piano and clean guitar work akin to that of gothic metal. Vocalist Mikael Stanne's prevalent use of clean vocals differentiated this release from their previous work. Because of its deviation from the band's previous efforts, Projector was met with a mixed reception by longtime fans, but it also attracted a fair number of new listeners.

Track listing

Release history
The limited edition digipak includes the bonus track "Exposure". However, there were problems with the pressings because not all the digipaks include "Exposure" and there are some traditional releases that include the track. The Japanese version of the album has different cover art and includes a booklet with more photos and biographical information. The 2009 reissue has digitally remastered audio.

Credits

Dark Tranquillity
 Mikael Stanne − vocals; lyrics, image editing and layout
 Niklas Sundin − lead guitar; cover artwork and inlay
 Fredrik Johansson – rhythm guitar
 Martin Henriksson − bass guitar; rhythm guitar (UnDo Control (Live) & ThereIn (Live))
 Anders Jivarp − drums

Production
Johan Carlberg − photography
Göran Finnberg – mastering (at The Mastering Room)
Ulf Horbelt – remastering

On "ThereIn" (Live)
Andrew Pardo – engineering
Tue Madsen – mixing, mastering
Alberto Rosetto – recording
Mario Struglia – recording

Additional musicians
Fredrik Norstrom – keyboards, piano, arrangements (6)
Johanna Andersson – co-vocals (3)
Michael Nicklasson − bass (UnDo Control (Live))
Daniel Antonsson – bass (ThereIn (Live))
Martin Brändström − keyboards and electronics (UnDo Control (Live) & ThereIn (Live))

References 

Dark Tranquillity albums
Century Media Records albums
1999 albums
Albums recorded at Studio Fredman